F. Riesz's theorem (named after Frigyes Riesz) is an important theorem in functional analysis that states that a Hausdorff topological vector space (TVS) is finite-dimensional if and only if it is locally compact. 
The theorem and its consequences are used ubiquitously in functional analysis, often used without being explicitly mentioned.

Statement 

Recall that a topological vector space (TVS)  is Hausdorff if and only if the singleton set  consisting entirely of the origin is a closed subset of  
A map between two TVSs is called a TVS-isomorphism or an isomorphism in the category of TVSs if it is a linear homeomorphism.

Consequences 

Throughout,  are TVSs (not necessarily Hausdorff) with  a finite-dimensional vector space.
 Every finite-dimensional vector subspace of a Hausdorff TVS is a closed subspace.
 All finite-dimensional Hausdorff TVSs are Banach spaces and all norms on such a space are equivalent.
 Every vector space isomorphism (i.e. a linear bijection) between two finite-dimensional Hausdorff TVSs is a TVS isomorphism.
 Finite-dimensional domain: A linear map  between Hausdorff TVSs is necessarily continuous.
 In particular, every linear functional of a finite-dimensional Hausdorff TVS is continuous.
 Finite-dimensional range: Any continuous surjective linear map  with a Hausdorff finite-dimensional range is an open map and thus a topological homomorphism. 
 A TVS  (not necessarily Hausdorff) is locally compact if and only if  is finite dimensional.
 The convex hull of a compact subset of a finite-dimensional Hausdorff TVS is compact.
 This implies, in particular, that the convex hull of a compact set is equal to the  convex hull of that set.
 A Hausdorff locally bounded TVS with the Heine-Borel property is necessarily finite-dimensional.

See also

References

Bibliography

   
  
  
  

Functional analysis
Lemmas